Launceston Christian School (Inc.) is a private, co-educational day school based in Riverside, Launceston, Tasmania, Australia. Established in 1976, the school is operated and controlled by an Association. Launceston Christian School caters for around 630 students from Kindergarten through to Year 12. The principal is Adrian Bosker.

School organisation
The school's mission statement is "To glorify and honour God through Christ-centered education". The school is organised into a junior school (K-6), middle school (7-9) and senior school (10-12). There are three team houses: Barrow (red), Tamar (gold) and Melaleuca (green).

References

External links
 Official site

High schools in Tasmania
Nondenominational Christian schools in Tasmania
Educational institutions established in 1976
Schools in Launceston, Tasmania
1976 establishments in Australia